María de las Mercedes Barbudo (1773 – February 17, 1849) was a Puerto Rican political activist, the first woman Independentista in the island, and a "Freedom Fighter". At the time, the Puerto Rican independence movement had ties with the Venezuelan rebels led by Simón Bolívar.

Early years
Barbudo (birth name: María de las Mercedes Barbudo y Coronado) was one of four siblings born in San Juan, the capital of Puerto Rico, to a Spanish father, Domingo Barbudo, and Puerto Rican mother, Belén Coronado. Her father was an officer in the Spanish Army. The benefits of being the daughter of a military officer was that she could afford to obtain an  education and to buy books. She was one of the few women in the island who learned to read because at the time, the only people who had access to libraries and who could afford books were either appointed Spanish government officials or wealthy landowners. The poor depended on oral story telling, in what are traditionally known in Puerto Rico as Coplas and Décimas. Well educated, Barbudo became interested in politics and social activism.

Political activist
As a young woman, Barbudo founded a sewing goods store in San Juan, specialising in the sale of buttons, threads and clothes. She eventually became successful as a personal loan provider. She dealt commercially with Joaquín Power y Morgan, an immigrant who came to Puerto Rico as a representative of the Compañía de Asiento de Negros, which regulated the slave trade on the island.

Barbudo moved in prominent circles, which included notable citizens such as Captain Ramón Power y Giralt (Joaquín's son), Bishop Juan Alejo de Arizmendi and the artist José Campeche. She had a liberal mind and as such would often hold meetings with intellectuals in her house. They discussed the political, social and economic situation of Puerto Rico and the Spanish Empire in general, and proposed solutions to improve the well-being of the people.

Simón Bolívar and Brigadier General Antonio Valero de Bernabé, known as "The Liberator from Puerto Rico", dreamed of creating a unified Latin America, including Puerto Rico and Cuba. Barbudo was inspired by Bolívar; she supported the idea of independence for the island and learned that Bolívar hoped to establish an American-style federation among all the newly independent republics of Latin America. He also wanted to promote individual rights. She befriended and wrote to many Venezuelan revolutionists, among them José María Rojas, with whom she regularly corresponded. She also received magazines and newspapers from Venezuela which upheld the ideals of Bolívar.

Held without bail or trial

The Spanish authorities in Puerto Rico under Governor Miguel de la Torre were suspicious of the correspondence between Barbudo and the Venezuelan rebel factions. Secret agents of the Spanish Government intercepted some of her mail, delivering it to Governor de la Torre. He ordered an investigation and had her mail confiscated. The Government believed that the correspondence served as propaganda of the Bolívarian ideals and that it would also serve to motivate Puerto Ricans to seek their independence.

Governor Miguel de la Torre ordered her arrest on the charge that she planned to overthrow the Spanish Government in Puerto Rico.  Barbudo was held without bail at the Castillo (Fort) de San Cristóbal, since the island did not have a prison for women. Among the evidence which the Spanish authorities presented against her was a letter dated October 1, 1824, from Rojas in which he told her that the Venezuelan rebels had lost their principal contact with the Puerto Rican independence movement in the Danish island of Saint Thomas and therefore the secret communication which existed between the Venezuelan rebels and the leaders of the Puerto Rican independence movement was in danger of being discovered.

On October 22, 1824, Barbudo appeared at a hearing before a magistrate. The Government presented as evidence against her various letters which included five letters from Rojas, two issues of the newspaper El Observador Caraqueño; two copies of the newspaper El Cometa, and one copy each of the newspapers El Constitucional Caraqueño and El Colombiano, which were sympathetic to Bolívar's ideals. When asked if she recognized the correspondence, she answered in the affirmative and refused to answer any more questions. The government also presented as evidence various anti-monarchy propaganda pamphlets to be distributed throughout the island. Barbudo was found guilty.

Exile and escape to Venezuela
Governor de la Torre consulted with the prosecutor Francisco Marcos Santaella as to what should be done with Barbudo. Santaella suggested that she be exiled from Puerto Rico and sent to Cuba. On October 23, 1824, de la Torre ordered that Barbudo be held under house arrest at the Castillo de San Cristóbal under the custody of Captain Pedro de Loyzaga. The following day Barbudo wrote to the governor, asking to be able to arrange her financial and her personal obligations before being exiled to Cuba. The Governor denied her request and on October 28 she was placed aboard the ship El Marinero.

In Cuba, she was held in an institution in which women accused of various crimes were housed. With the help of revolutionary factions, Barbudo escaped and went to Saint Thomas Island. She eventually arrived at La Guaira in Venezuela where her friend José María Rojas met her. They went to Caracas where she met Bolívar. Barbudo established a close relationship with the members of Bolívar's cabinet which included José María Vargas. He later was elected as the fourth president of Venezuela. She worked closely with the cabinet.

Legacy and honors
Barbudo never married nor had any children and did not return to Puerto Rico. She died on February 17, 1849. She was buried in the Cathedral of Caracas next to Simón Bolívar. Interment in the Cathedral was an honor usually reserved only for the church hierarchy and the very rich.

In 1996, a documentary was made about her titled Camino sin retorno, el destierro de María de las Mercedes Barbudo (Road of no return, the exile of María de las Mercedes Barbudo). It was produced and directed by Sonia Fritz.

Further reading
"María de las Mercedes Barbudo: Primera mujer independentista de Puerto Rico, 1773–1849"; by: Raquel Rosario Rivera; Publisher: R. Rosario Rivera; 1. ed edition (1997); .
"Mercedes"; by: Jaime L. Marzán Ramos; Publisher:Isla Negra Editores;  .
"From Eve to Dawn, A History of Women in the World, Volume IV: Revolutions and Struggles for Justice in the 20th Century"; by Marilyn French; Publisher: The Feminist Press at CUNY; 
"Women in Latin America and the Caribbean: Restoring Women to History (Restoring Women to History)"; by Marysa Navarro; Publisher: Indiana University Press;

See also

List of Puerto Ricans
History of women in Puerto Rico
Antonio Valero de Bernabé
Ducoudray Holstein Expedition

19th Century female leaders of the Puerto Rican Independence Movement
 
Lola Rodríguez de Tió
Mariana Bracetti

Female members of the Puerto Rican Nationalist Party

Blanca Canales
Rosa Collazo 
Lolita Lebrón
Ruth Mary Reynolds 
Isabel Rosado
Isabel Freire de Matos
Isolina Rondón
Olga Viscal Garriga

 Articles related to the Puerto Rican Independence Movement

Puerto Rican Nationalist Party Revolts of the 1950s
Puerto Rican Nationalist Party
Ponce massacre
Río Piedras massacre
Puerto Rican Independence Party
Grito de Lares
Intentona de Yauco
Ruben Berrios
Maria de Lourdes Santiago

References

1773 births
1849 deaths
People from San Juan, Puerto Rico
Puerto Rican people of Spanish descent
Puerto Rican nationalists
Puerto Rican women in politics
Imprisoned Puerto Rican independence activists
Puerto Rican independence activists
19th-century Puerto Rican people
Female revolutionaries
19th-century businesswomen